Əliqulular (also, Əliqullar, Alikular, and Alikulular) is a village and municipality in the Imishli Rayon of Azerbaijan.  It has a population of 2,197.

References 

Populated places in Imishli District